is a Japanese video game developer. The company has been one of the largest studios in Japan. The company develops games for various platforms including arcade, Nintendo Wii, Nintendo DS, Nintendo 3DS, Facebook, Japanese SNS such as GREE and Mobage, and Pachinko. The studio is best known for Incredible Crisis and the Galerians series. The company has been a top developer and publisher for Japanese mobile social game field. Polygon Magic has been helping GREE to develop their first party titles. The company has its own social game platform, Porimaji Games.

Games developed

Arcade
Fighter's Impact (1996)
Incredible Crisis (1999)
Dragon Chronicle (2003)
Wangan Midnight Maximum Tune (2004)
Wangan Midnight Maximum Tune 2 (2005)
Lethal Enforcers 3 (2004)
Thrill Drive 3 (2005)
OutRun 2 SP SDX (2006)
Silent Hill: The Arcade (2007)

PlayStation
Vs. (1997)Incredible Crisis (1999)Galerians (1999)Lord of Fist / Shaolin (1999)Slap Happy Rhythm Busters (2000)Matsumoto Leiji 999 ~Story of Galaxy Express 999~ (2001)

PlayStation 2Street Golfer (2002)Galerians: Ash (2002)Seven Samurai 20XX (2004)

XboxTecmo Classic Arcade (2005)

Game Boy ColorNintama Rantarou: Ninjutsu Gakuen ni Nyuugaku Shiyou no Dan (2001)

GameCubeDisney Sports Basketball (2002)Bleach GC: Tasogare ni Mamieru Shinigami (2005)

Nintendo DSTenchu: Dark Secret (2006)Tecmo Bowl: Kickoff (2008)

WiiBleach: Shattered Blade (2006)Ghost Squad (2007)We Fish (2009)

MobageDerby x Derby (2010)Kabu x Kuwa Battle Masters (2010)

GREETsuri Sta (2008）Published by GREECorde Mania (2010）Published by SumzupSengoku Kingdom (2011）Published by GREE

FacebookNijiiro Dobutsuen / Rainbow Zoo (2010)

Own SNS platformPorimaji Games / Polygon Magic Games'' (2010)

References

External links
 
 Polygon Magic at MobyGames

Amusement companies of Japan
Japanese companies established in 1996
Privately held companies of Japan
Software companies based in Tokyo
Video game companies established in 1996
Video game companies of Japan
Video game development companies